Waldemar Józef Matysik (born 27 September 1961, in Stanica) is a retired Polish footballer.

He played mostly for Górnik Zabrze, where he scored seven goals in 127 matches. In 1987, he went abroad and played for AJ Auxerre in France (110 matches) and later for Hamburger SV (94 matches, one goal) in Germany. In 1993, he went to Wuppertaler SV (35 games, two goals), a year later Matysik chose VfB 1914 Wissen (26 games). His professional career ended at Rot-Weiss Essen, where during the years 1996–97 Matysik played 49 matches.

He played for the Polish national team (55 matches) and was a participant at the 1982 FIFA World Cup, where Poland won the bronze medal and at the 1986 FIFA World Cup.

References

External links 
 
 

1961 births
Living people
People from Gliwice County
Polish footballers
Poland international footballers
Association football midfielders
1982 FIFA World Cup players
1986 FIFA World Cup players
Górnik Zabrze players
Hamburger SV players
AJ Auxerre players
Rot-Weiss Essen players
Wuppertaler SV players
Ekstraklasa players
Bundesliga players
2. Bundesliga players
Ligue 1 players
Polish expatriate footballers
Expatriate footballers in West Germany
Expatriate footballers in France
Sportspeople from Silesian Voivodeship
VfB Wissen players